Benjamin Creek is a stream in Alberta, Canada. It is a tributary of Fallentimber Creek.

Benjamin Creek has the name of Jonas Benjamin, a Stoney tribal leader.

See also
List of rivers of Alberta

References

Rivers of Alberta